Ada and Ethel was a wooden schooner that was wrecked  southeast of Seal Rocks, New South Wales, Australia, on 26 October 1887.

Ship description and construction 
On 9 January 1886, Mr. Roderick of Eagleton, New South Wales, launched a new vessel built to the order of Messrs. Captain C. T. Messell and E. Davies, of Sydney, New South Wales. The christening ceremony was performed with champagne by Miss Ada Messell, Captain Messell's daughter. The vessel was named after Ada and her infant sister Ethel May, who died approximately 12 months later.

Ada and Ethel then was taken to Sydney, entering Sydney Heads at half-past eleven on the night of 19 February 1886 under tow by the steamer Malua and was brought up in Pyrmont Bight to have her mast and other fittings installed. The passage down from Williams River was made in 10 hours.

Ada and Ethel was rigged as a fore-and-aft schooner, intended for the coasting trade. She was built substantially of the best colonial hardwood, coppered, and copper-fastened. She was a sister ship of Julian, which was launched about eight months earlier and belonged to the same firm.

Wreck 
Ada and Ethel left port on the afternoon of 26 October 1887 under the command of Captain Frederick. They soon found that the ship was taking on water so rapidly that by 19:30 the vessel became unmanageable, and Captain Frederick endeavoured to make for Port Stephens, New South Wales, where he intended to beach her. However, it was soon apparent that Ada and Ethel would not reach the shore, and Captain Frederick and the five members of his crew abandoned ship off Seal Rocks, New South Wales.

References

Further reading 
Wrecks on the New South Wales Coast. By Loney, J. K. (Jack Kenneth), 1925–1995 Oceans Enterprises. 1993 .
Australian Shipwrecks - vol1 1622-1850, Charles Bateson, AH and AW Reed, Sydney, 1972, Call number 910.4530994 BAT
Australian shipwrecks Vol. 2 1851–1871 By Loney, J. K. (Jack Kenneth), 1925–1995. Sydney. Reed, 1980 910.4530994 LON
Australian shipwrecks Vol. 3 1871–1900 By Loney, J. K. (Jack Kenneth), 1925–1995. Geelong Vic: List Publishing, 1982 910.4530994 LON
Australian shipwrecks Vol. 4 1901–1986 By Loney, J. K. (Jack Kenneth),  1925–1995. Portarlington Vic. Marine History Publications, 1987 910.4530994 LON
Australian shipwrecks Vol. 5 Update 1986 By Loney, J. K. (Jack Kenneth),  1925–1995. Portarlington Vic. Marine History Publications, 1991 910.4530994 LON

External links 
Australian National Shipwreck Database
Australian Shipping - Arrivals and Departures 1788-1968 including shipwrecks
Encyclopaedia of Australian Shipwrecks - New South Wales Shipwrecks

Ships built in New South Wales
1886 ships
Maritime incidents in October 1887
Shipwrecks of the Mid North Coast Region
1871–1900 ships of Australia
Coastal trading vessels of Australia
Schooners of Australia